Ferdinand Hoel (7 October 1890 – 12 January 1969) was an Austrian footballer. He played in four matches for the Austria national football team in 1915.

References

External links
 

1890 births
1969 deaths
Austrian footballers
Austria international footballers
Place of birth missing
Association footballers not categorized by position